This is an incomplete list of unsolved known and presumed murders in the United Kingdom. It does not include any of the 3,000 or so murders that took place in Northern Ireland due to the Troubles and remain unsolved. Victims believed or known to have been murdered by the same perpetrator(s) are grouped together.

 List of unsolved murders in the United Kingdom (before 1970)
 List of unsolved murders in the United Kingdom (1970s)
 List of unsolved murders in the United Kingdom (1980s)
 List of unsolved murders in the United Kingdom (1990s)
 List of unsolved murders in the United Kingdom (2000–present)

 List of people who disappeared mysteriously

References

External links
The BBC News Magazine article "When the murder trail goes cold" lists statistics for unsolved murders in the United Kingdom .
A website devoted to unsolved murders in the UK can be found at Unsolved Murders

Lists of victims of crimes
 
United Kingdom crime-related lists
Lists of events in the United Kingdom
United Kingdom unsolved